Dywizjon 303 may refer to:

No. 303 Polish Fighter Squadron
Squadron 303 (book)